Leon Kelly (born 26 June 1978) is an English former footballer who played in the Football League for Cambridge United. His uncle Tony was also a professional footballer.

External links
 Leon Kelly stats at Soccerbase.com

English footballers
English Football League players
1978 births
Living people
Atherstone Town F.C. players
Cambridge United F.C. players
Stalybridge Celtic F.C. players
Nuneaton Borough F.C. players
Dover Athletic F.C. players
Ilkeston Town F.C. (1945) players
Worcester City F.C. players
Hinckley United F.C. players
Solihull Moors F.C. players
Bromsgrove Rovers F.C. players
Aylesbury United F.C. players
Association football forwards